Lake Nash Station, most commonly known as Lake Nash, is a cattle station on the Barkly Tableland in the Northern Territory, Australia.

Location
The property shares a boundary with Georgina Downs and Austral Downs to the north, Argadargada to the west, Manners Creek Station to the south and the Queensland border to the east. Several waterways such as the Georgina River, Milne River, Manners Creek, Georgina Creek, Goyder Creek and Gordon Creek cross the property.

Description
The property includes the historic homestead and original police station. The area is rolling plains of black soil well covered with Mitchell grass overlaying limestone.

History

The station was established by John Costello, the son of Irish immigrants, who built the property up over the early years. Costello had acquired the property in 1879 from Mr F. Scar who had sold it unstocked. Costello began to stock the station later the same year when he had 700 head of mixed cattle overlanded from Carrawal where he had previously worked. Fattened cattle were taken overland to Adelaide for market in the 1880s.

Costello sold the property in 1905.

In 1915 the station was acquired by the Queensland National Pastoral Company, which had been formed to take over the pastoral properties owned by the Queensland National Bank. The company had raised capital of £850,000 and had invested in properties totalling in area, of which Lake Nash comprised .

Two Aboriginal men known as Dynamite Joe and Paddy Fraser were arguing over a woman when Joe attacked Fraser with an axe causing severe abdominal injuries. Fraser died en route to Cloncurry from internal injuries. Joe made his escape but was later caught and sent back to Lake Nash for trial.

In 1917 some 800 head of cattle were stolen from the station with two men, Thomas Hanlan and James Wickham, being arrested after they were found in possession of 200 of the stolen cattle near Frew River. Both men were found to be guilty and sentenced to five years hard labour and fined £100.

In 1950, Lake Nash came under scrutiny for using slave labour on the property as pumpers. The station was permitted to use much cheaper native labour only if white labour was not available, but this rule had been found to have been seriously breached by the station owners.

The property was in the grip of drought in 1952 with less than a quarter of the normal number of cattle being led along the Murranji Track. The following year the property was hit by drought with only  of rain falling in the first eight months; this in turn meant that cattle could not be moved far from waterholes or bores, as little water lay along the stock routes.

The station was acquired by the Georgina Pastoral Company, a partnership between Peter Hughes and Bill Scott, and Scott's son George took up management of the property in 2004. After suffering a drought through 2008 the area received good rains in the summer of 2009 when the property was still being managed by George Scott and had 20-25 employees working on the station. The station is made up of three separate leases that are run as one entity  Lake Nash, Georgina Downs and Argadargada  and has a carrying capacity of 55,000 head in a good season including approximately 30,000 cross-bred breeders. The herd is a mix of Santa Gertrudis, Brahman, Charbrais, Senepol and Waggui cattle.

See also
List of ranches and stations
List of the largest stations in Australia

References

Pastoral leases in the Northern Territory
Stations (Australian agriculture)